Charles William Clenshaw (15 March 1926, Southend-on-Sea, Essex – 23 September 2004) was an English mathematician, specializing in numerical analysis. He is known for the Clenshaw algorithm (1955) and Clenshaw–Curtis quadrature (1960). In a 1984 paper Beyond Floating Point, Clenshaw and Frank W. J. Olver introduced symmetric level-index arithmetic.

Biography
Charles William Clenshaw attended the local high school in Southend-on-Sea from 1937 to 1943. In 1946 he graduated with a degree in mathematics and physics from King's College London. There in 1948 he graduated with a PhD in mathematics. From 1945 to 1969 he was a mathematician at the UK's National Physical Laboratory (NPL) in Bushy Park, Teddington. There from 1961 to 1969 he was a senior principal scientific officer and headed the numerical methods group in NPL's mathematics division. In 1969 he resigned from NPL and accepted an appointment as professor of numerical analysis at Lancaster University. He and Emlyn Howard Lloyd (1918–2008), professor of statistics, strengthened the mathematics department, and the department's numerical analysis group became one of best in the UK. The mathematics department hosted the first four summer schools in numerical analysis sponsored by the UK's Engineering and Physical Sciences Research Council.

Clenshaw did research in approximation theory based on Chebyshev polynomials, software development supporting trigonometric functions, Bessel functions, etc., and computer arithmetic systems. His PhD students include William Allan Light (1950–2002).

Upon his death, Clenshaw was survived by his wife, three sons, a daughter, and ten grandchildren. Sgt. Ian Charles Cooper Clenshaw (1918–1940), one of Charles William Clenshaw's brothers, was officially the first RAF pilot to be killed in the Battle of Britain.

Selected publications
  (over 380 citations)
  (over 240 citations)
  (over 1110 citations)
 
 
 
 
 
 
 
 
  (over 100 citations)

References

1926 births
2004 deaths
Alumni of King's College London
Academics of Lancaster University
English computer scientists
20th-century English mathematicians
21st-century English mathematicians
Approximation theorists
Numerical analysts